Sukhostav is a village in Husiatyn Raion, Ternopil Oblast, western Ukraine. According to the 2001 Ukraine Census, it has population of 982. It is the administrative center of Sukhostav rural council.

There is a Church of the Nativity of the Theotokos in Sukhostav.

History
In 1553  of King Sigismund II Augustus court obtains a privilege from King to establish a miasteczko (market town) in place of the village of Jablonow. For faster development it was granted the Magdeburg rights and relieved of state taxes for 15 years. Eventually Jablonow remained a village, and the miasteczko named Suchostaw was established nearby. The coat of arms of the place was Pilawa (the owner's) on the blue field, with the golden fish on the bottom (Only fish remained on the current c.o.a.). Over time it changed owners. It was destroyed during the Khmelnytsky Cossack Uprising (1648-1657) and rebuilt again.  During the Partitions of  Poland it belonged to the Austrian Partition.<ref name=gdic>Geographical Dictionary of the Kingdom of Poland, vol. XI, p. 540</ref>

Jewish history
When the mizateczko'' was restored after the  Cossack Uprising, Jewish innkeepers, renters and tradesmen started settling the place. During World War I some 200 Jews emigrated, but some 40 families stayed, engaged in small crafts and peddling.

During World War II the Jewish population was expelled to the nearby town of Khorostkiv and most probably the were exterminated during the Holocaust.

References

Villages in Chortkiv Raion
Populated places established in 1553
Shtetls